Agin may refer to:
Ağın, a town in Turkey
Agin, alternative name of Aghin, a town in Armenia
Agin (surname), Russian last name
Agin, a deity in Scythian religion